Zhang Jing (张静; born ) is a retired Chinese female volleyball player, playing as an outside hitter. She was part of the China women's national volleyball team.

She participated in the 2002 FIVB Volleyball Women's World Championship.
She won the gold medal at the 2002 Asian Games. On club level she played for Shanghai in 2002.

References

1979 births
Living people
Chinese women's volleyball players
Volleyball players at the 2002 Asian Games
Medalists at the 2002 Asian Games
Place of birth missing (living people)
Asian Games medalists in volleyball
Asian Games gold medalists for China
Outside hitters